Daouda Gueye (born 22 December 1995) is a Senegalese professional footballer who plays as a forward for French club Créteil.

Career
On 13 May 2020, after a prolific season with Bourges 18 Gueye signed a professional contract with Rodez AF. Gueye made his professional debut with Rodez in a 2–2 Ligue 2 tie with Sochaux on 19 September 2020.

On 18 January 2021, Gueye joined Championnat National side Sète on loan.

On 26 August 2021, he moved to Marseille B. A year later, in August 2022, he moved to fellow league club US Créteil-Lusitanos.

References

External links
 
 

1995 births
Living people
Footballers from Dakar
Senegalese footballers
Association football forwards
Rodez AF players
Bourges 18 players
Aubagne FC players
FC Sète 34 players
US Créteil-Lusitanos players
Ligue 2 players
Championnat National players
Championnat National 2 players
Championnat National 3 players
Senegal Premier League players
Senegalese expatriate footballers
Senegalese expatriates in France
Expatriate footballers in France